Shri Guru Ram Rai University is a private university located in Dehradun, Uttarakhand, India.

References

External links

Universities and colleges in Uttarakhand
Private universities in India
2017 establishments in Uttarakhand
Educational institutions established in 2017